Parsons problems are a form of an objective assessment in which respondents are asked to select from a selection of code fragments, some subset of which comprise the problem solution. The Parsons problem format is used in the learning and teaching of computer programming.

Dale Parsons and Patricia Haden of Otago Polytechnic developed Parsons's Programming Puzzles to aid the mastery of basic syntactic and logical constructs of computer programming languages, in particular Turbo Pascal, although any programming language may be used. Parson's programming puzzles became known as Parsons puzzles and then Parsons problems. Parsons problems have become popular as they are easier to grade than written code while capturing the students problem solving ability shown in a code creation process.

Structure 
Parsons problems consist of a partially completed solution and a selection of lines of code that some of which, when arranged appropriately, correctly complete the solution. There is great flexibility in how Parsons problems can be designed, including the types of code fragments from which to select, and how much structure of the solution is provided in the question. Easier Parsons problems provide the complete block structure of the solution included in the question, and the provided lines of code simply need to be reordered and inserted into that structure.

In the Parsons problem exam question, the first example shown, there are 6 pairs of statements, one mark is deducted for each incorrectly chosen line from the pairs, two marks are deducted if more than 2 lines are out of place, and one mark is deducted if up to two things are out of place. One mark is deducted if opening and closing braces are incorrectly used, or are not include where necessary.

Variants

Two-dimensional 

The two-dimensional variants require the student to also correctly indent the code instead of merely re-ordering the provided lines of code.

Faded 

In the faded variants, the lines of code may additionally contain blanks that the student needs to fill in.

Advantages 
The advantages of Parsons problems include:
 being a complement or alternative to traditional programming exercises like code-tracing and code-writing
 the design of Parsons problems is flexible
 there are many variants that are continuously refined to better address student needs

Disadvantages 
The effectiveness of Parsons problems, both as a question type and as a learning tool in CS education, remains uncertain due to a lack of replicated research in the field.

Automation 
Parsons problems can be automated.

References

External links 
 Faded Parsons Problems
 js-parsons - a JavaScript library for Parsons Problems

Computer science education